There are two films named The Stronghold:

The Stronghold (French film)
The Stronghold (Ukrainian film)